Bienville National Forest is a United States National Forest in central Mississippi, named for Jean-Baptiste Le Moyne de Bienville. The forest is headquartered in Jackson, as are all six National Forests in Mississippi, with local ranger district offices located in Forest, Mississippi.

The forest lies within the Southeastern mixed forests ecoregion and supports mixed forests of pine and oak.

The upper courses of the Leaf and Strong Rivers flow through the forest. Recreational opportunities include camping, hiking, boating and fishing for bass, bream, and crappie on Marathon Lake and Shongelo Lake.

There are three Wildlife Management Areas (WMA) within Bienville National Forest: Bienville WMA; Tallahalla WMA; and Caney Creek WMA. Each of these areas offers hunting opportunities for white-tailed deer, wild turkey, and various small game. Recent years have seen an influx of invasive wild pigs, which can be legally taken with legal weapons during any open season.

References

External links
 

National Forests of Mississippi
Protected areas established in 1936
Protected areas of Scott County, Mississippi
Protected areas of Smith County, Mississippi
Protected areas of Jasper County, Mississippi
Protected areas of Newton County, Mississippi